The Yunan dialect is a dialect of Goulou Yue spoken in Yunan County, Yunfu, Guangdong.

Phonology 
The following table shows the pronunciation differences for selected Hanzi between Beijing Mandarin and the Yunan dialect.

References 

Yunfu
Cantonese language
Yue Chinese